Raymond Freeman FRS (6 January 1932 – 1 May 2022) was a British chemist and professor at Jesus College, Cambridge who made important contributions to NMR spectroscopy.

Education

Freeman was educated at Nottingham High School where he won an Open Scholarship to Lincoln College, Oxford in December 1949 and (at the instigation of Lincoln College) deferred his admission to Oxford to complete his military service in the Royal Air Force as a radar instructor, reaching the rank of acting corporal, un-paid.

In October 1951 he returned to Oxford and began his studies in Chemistry under the tutorship of Rex Richards, going on to do research in Rex's group on NMR of the less-common nuclei (in particular 59Co) and earning his Master of Arts and Doctor of Philosophy degrees.

Career
Joining the magnetic resonance group of Anatole Abragam at Saclay, France in 1957, Freeman did postdoctoral research under the direction of the NMR pioneer Robert Pound (on leave from Harvard) on the super-regenerative oscillator, and exploited that device to build a stable high-resolution NMR spectrometer.

Varian Associates, California
After three years at the National Physical Laboratory, Teddington, United Kingdom, in the Basic Physics Division, Freeman took leave of absence in 1961 to work on double irradiation techniques with Wes Anderson at Varian Associates in Palo Alto, California. This environment proved so stimulating that one year was extended to twelve, and the young family grew up as Californians; three children have now settled on the West Coast. 
 
Along with research at Varian on double-resonance, double-quantum effects, spin-lattice relaxation, and Fourier transformation, Freeman assisted in the development of new Varian NMR spectrometers (XL-100 and CFT-20).

Back to Oxford
In 1973 Freeman returned to Oxford as University Lecturer and Fellow of Magdalen College, and started his own research group focused on high-resolution NMR methodology. 
 
He received the degree of Doctor of Science in 1975 and was elected Fellow of the Royal Society in 1979.
 
With his research students at Oxford, several publications on new NMR techniques were produced, including work on two-dimensional NMR. Freeman acknowledged that part of this work was triggered by the seminal suggestion of Jean Jeener at a meeting in Brussels.

A Handbook of Magnetic Resonance
On a short sabbatical at Caltech in Pasadena, Freeman published "A Handbook of Magnetic Resonance" (translated into Japanese and Russian).

Cambridge
In 1987 Freeman moved to the University of Cambridge to take up the Plummer chair of magnetic resonance, and was elected a Fellow of Jesus College. There he continued his research on NMR methodology and wrote a second book, "Spin Choreography". 
 
Freeman took statutory retirement in 1999, but continued his research with a long-time colleague Eriks Kupce, and produced his third book, "NMR in Chemistry and Medicine", published in 2003, and later translated into Russian.

Awards and honours
Freeman was elected a Fellow of the Royal Society (FRS) in 1979, his nomination reads: 

Freeman was also awarded the Royal Medal in 2002.

Personal life
In 1958 Freeman married Anne-Marie Périnet-Marquet (originally from Haute Savoie, France). They had five children.

References

1932 births
2022 deaths
Royal Medal winners
British chemists
Fellows of Jesus College, Cambridge
Fellows of the Royal Society
Members of the University of Cambridge Department of Chemistry
Fellows of Magdalen College, Oxford
Academics of the University of Cambridge
Alumni of Lincoln College, Oxford
John Humphrey Plummer Professors